The 1986 British National Track Championships were a series of track cycling competitions held from 1–10 August 1986 at the Leicester Velodrome.

Medal summary

Men's Events

Women's Events

References

1986 in British sport
August 1986 sports events in the United Kingdom